Trent Jones (born 12 August 1994) is a New Zealand male  BMX rider, representing his nation at international competitions. He competed in the time trial event at the 2015 UCI BMX World Championships.

References

External links

 
 
 
 
 

1994 births
Living people
BMX riders
New Zealand male cyclists
Olympic cyclists of New Zealand
Cyclists at the 2016 Summer Olympics
Place of birth missing (living people)
21st-century New Zealand people